This is a list of physical video games for the Nintendo DS, DS Lite, and DSi handheld game consoles. It does not include games released on DSiWare or the iQue DS. The last game for the Nintendo DS, Big Hero 6: Battle in the Bay, was released on October 28, 2014.

Games 
There are currently  games in this table across all pages: A to C, D to I, J to P, and Q to Z.

Applications 
There are  applications included in the list.

Bundles 
There are  games included in the list.

Other

See also
 List of DSiWare games and applications
 List of Game Boy games
 List of Game Boy Advance games
 List of Game Boy Color games
 List of Nintendo DS Wi-Fi Connection games
 List of Wii games
 Lists of video games

References

DS
Nintendo DS games
Nintendo DS games (D-I)